Gouxia danielaferreroae is a species of mealybug that lives in France. It was placed in a monotypic genus by Lucien Goux in 1989, but the genus name he used, Giraudia, was a junior homonym of at least two other animal genera. The genus was renamed Gouxia in his honour in 2009.

References 

Hemiptera of Europe
Monotypic Hemiptera genera
Sternorrhyncha genera
Pseudococcidae